The Babe Ruth Award is given annually to the Major League Baseball (MLB) player with the best performance in the postseason. The award, created in honor of Babe Ruth, was first awarded in 1949 to New York Yankee pitcher, Joe Page, the MVP of the World Series, one year after Ruth's death. The award was created by the New York City chapter of the Baseball Writers' Association of America (BBWAA). It continued to be awarded exclusively for performances in the World Series until 2007, when the New York chapter of the BBWAA changed the award to cover the entire postseason. Though it is older than the World Series Most Valuable Player Award, which was not created until 1955 (as the "SPORT Magazine Award"), the Babe Ruth Award is considered less prestigious, because it is not sanctioned by MLB and is awarded several weeks after the World Series.

MLB expanded its postseason to include the League Championship Series (LCS) in 1969, the League Division Series (LDS) in 1995, and the Wild Card round in 2012. The Wild Card round is a one-game playoff, the LDS follows a best-of-five playoff format, and the LCS and World Series follow a best-of-seven playoff format. In 2020, the Los Angeles Dodgers, won the 2020 World Series, but Randy Arozarena of the Tampa Bay Rays was named winner of the Babe Ruth Award.

Ruth was a noted slugger who batted .326 with 15 home runs and three wins in three games started as a pitcher during World Series play. However, the Babe Ruth Award does not only go to sluggers or pitchers. Dick Green won the award for the 1974 World Series, in which he batted 0-for-13, but helped the Oakland Athletics win the series with his defense.

Joe Page of the New York Yankees was the first winner of the Babe Ruth Award, and Jonathan Papelbon of the Boston Red Sox was the first winner since the award criteria changed to cover the entire postseason. In all, members of the Yankees have won the award sixteen times. Luis Tiant and Randy Arozarena are the only winners of the Babe Ruth Award to play for the World Series–losing team. Two players, Sandy Koufax and Jack Morris, have won the award twice.

Winners

Key to table

Table of winners

Image gallery

See also

"This Year in Baseball Awards" Best Major Leaguer, Postseason
List of Major League Baseball awards
Baseball awards
 Conn Smythe Trophy, the National Hockey League's award for its postseason MVP

Notes

References

Major League Baseball trophies and awards
Major League Baseball postseason
World Series trophies and awards
Most valuable player awards
Awards established in 1949
Award
1949 establishments in New York City